Svetlana K-Lie (born in 1977 in Moscow) is a Russian artist living and working in Lewes, UK. Originally trained as a sculptor, she works with a broad range of materials and techniques as her practice expands to photography, printmaking and drawing.

Education
Svetlana K-Lie graduated in 2000 with a Master of Arts from the Moscow Faculty of Applied Arts. She then further developed her practice at the I.I. Nevinsky Etching Art Studio and Babushkinski Ceramic Studio. In 2007 she moved to London where she graduated from the Camberwell College of Arts with a Master of Arts in Drawing.

Exhibitions
Her work has been exhibited in major museums in Moscow and St.Petersburg as well as in the Saatchi Gallery in London in 2010. In 2009 she collaborated with Michael Nyman on the occasion of the Anglo-Moskva Festival in Moscow and was commissioned a sculpture by the Third Moscow Biennale of Contemporary Art.

Awards
In 2004 she was awarded the title of best woman sculptor of Russia and in 2005 of best young sculptor of Russia. Most recently, in 2010, she won runner up in the Best Sculpture category at the Battle Contemporary Fine Art Fair. She also won in the same year the 3rd prize of the RK Harrison Prizes For Art Photography at the National Open Art Competition 2010. In 2011, one of her steel sculptures was selected for the Open West Competition.

References

External links
 Artist official website
 Artist profile on Saatchi Online
 Interview for Nikon Russia, December 2009 (Russian)

1977 births
Living people
21st-century Russian women artists
21st-century Russian artists
Alumni of Camberwell College of Arts
Artists from Moscow
Russian photographers
Russian printmakers
21st-century Russian sculptors
20th-century Russian sculptors
Russian women photographers
Women printmakers
21st-century women photographers
20th-century Russian women